2019 MO, temporarily designated A10eoM1, was a small, harmless 3-meter near-Earth asteroid discovered by ATLAS–MLO that impacted Earth's atmosphere on 22 June 2019 at 21:25 UT. The impact of the bolide generated a 5-kiloton-equivalent explosion off the south coast of Puerto Rico which was detected by infrasound detectors. The strewn field would be spread over the Caribbean Sea.

The Apollo asteroid was inbound approaching a late July perihelion (closest approach to the Sun) when it impacted Earth at 16.1 km/s.

Overview
The asteroid was discovered by ATLAS–MLO on 22 June 2019 and was observed four times with an observation arc of just 30 minutes, typical for ATLAS discoveries before they are followed up by other resources. With such a short observation arc, how far away (and, therefore, how large) the object is very uncertain until more data are available. Using these four observations, JPL's Scout listed the impact risk as modest, and calculated that the asteroid was about 160 meters in diameter and would pass about 36 LD (14 million km) from Earth. A fireball was however reported. When the Caribbean bolide report came in from the GOES-16 weather satellite it was possible to link the ATLAS astrometry to it. Using all seven observations, Scout then obtained a significantly better orbit determination with an impact rating of "elevated". The updated orbit shows that the asteroid was about 1.3 LD (500,000 km) from Earth when ATLAS-MLO observed it, 12 hours before impact.

Visibility 
The asteroid came to opposition 175 degrees from the Sun on 17 May 2019 when it had an apparent magnitude of 27. Such a faint apparent magnitude would require a 10-hour image to detect with the largest 8-meter class telescopes in the world. Pan-STARRS is a 1.8-meter class telescope and with 30 second images has a limiting apparent magnitude of around 22. ATLAS has a limiting apparent magnitude closer to 19. The asteroid first became brighter than apparent magnitude 23 on 19 June, when it was about 4 million km from Earth. The asteroid was detected by ATLAS when it was apparent magnitude 18.1.

Meteorites 

This bolide was a probable meteorite fall into waters 4.8 km deep. NEXRAD weather radar detected falling meteorites at 21:26:15 UT at 10.6 km above sea level. Signatures consistent with falling meteorites appear in a total of four radar sweeps. Meteorite falls with enough mass to generate green pixels on weather radar are very rare.

Origin 
It could be an Alinda asteroid originating from the 3:1 mean-motion resonance with Jupiter. Even though 2019 MO has a geometric similarity to the June epsilon Ophiuchids and four other minor meteor showers, it could just as easily be a sporadic meteor that just looks similar by chance. 2019 MO is about 12° away from the concentration of June epsilon Ophiuchids orbits.

Notes

See also
 Asteroid impact prediction
 
 2014 AA
 2018 LA

References

External links 
 
 
 

Alinda asteroids
Discoveries by ATLAS
Minor planet object articles (unnumbered)
Modern Earth impact events
2019 in space
20190622
20190622